The Wisconsin Economic Development Corporation (WEDC) is a public-private agency in the state of Wisconsin designed to assist business development and innovation through loans, grants, tax credits, and technical assistance programs.

History
WEDC was established in 2011 during the tenure of Gov. Scott Walker to replace the Wisconsin Department of Commerce. The impetus for WEDC resulted from a 2010 report titled “Be Bold Wisconsin: The Wisconsin Competitiveness Study” that recommended a non-political authority be created to design and deliver a statewide economic development strategy.

Structure

Leadership and governance
WEDC is led by a cabinet-level official who holds the titles of secretary and CEO. The post, currently held by Melissa "Missy" Hughes, is appointed by the governor and confirmed by the Senate. WEDC has an 18-member board of directors. The governor nominates six board members, who then need Senate approval; the Assembly speaker and Senate majority leader each appoint four individuals; and the Senate and Assembly minority leaders each appoint one. The secretary of the Department of Administration and the secretary of the Department of Revenue serve as nonvoting members.

Funding
WEDC receives revenue from several sources, including State General Purpose Revenues (from state legislative appropriation); the State Economic Development Fund (from 3% tax on corporations); Brownfield Site Assessment (collected through the state's environmental fund); intergovernmental revenues (e.g. federal grants); interest on loans; charges for services (loan origination fees, bond servicing fees, tax transfer fees, sponsorship contribution); interest on investments; and other revenues (receipts which do not fall into one of the other categories).

Offices
WEDC has several divisions and offices, including the Global Trade and Investment division, which works with businesses to identify partners and navigate export processes; the Business and Community Development division, which works with local officials through financial assistance to revitalize commercial districts; the Entrepreneurship and Innovation division, which provides support to start-ups using tax incentives; and the Office of Rural Prosperity, which aims to assist farmers and rural residents.

Financial and technical assistance programs

Overview
WEDC provides assistance to businesses, communities, and individuals through grants, loans, and tax credits, including: 
 Community Development Investment Grants provide incentives to redevelopment projects that add jobs, primarily in downtown business districts.
 Technology Development Loans provide financial assistance to startups and growth companies to build workforce skills. 
 Business Development Tax Credits provide incentives to businesses that expand in or relocate to the state.
 Enterprise Zones provide tax incentives to companies who expand in or relocate to targeted economic areas. 
 Qualified New Business Venture credits provide early-stage businesses with tax credits of up to 25 percent of equity investment.

Other programs include grants for brownfield redevelopment, fabrication laboratories, workforce training, and businesses owned by minorities, women and veterans.

Pandemic
In 2020, WEDC provided nearly $240 million in direct assistance to more than 55,000 small businesses impacted by the COVID-19 pandemic, funded through the federal CARES Act. WEDC also reallocated $5 million in internal resources to Community Development Financial Institutions for grants to existing loan customers to help with short-term cash flow and to protect jobs and public health during the COVID-19 outbreak.

Controversy
In 2017, WEDC entered into a contract with Foxconn Technology Group, Hon Hai Precision Manufacturing, and SIO International (collectively known as Foxconn) to provide up to $2.85 billion in tax credits over a period of 15 years if the company built a $10 billion Generation 10.5 liquid crystal display panel plant and employed 13,000 workers in Mount Pleasant, Wisconsin. In 2020, WEDC notified the company it was ineligible to receive the credits because the facility specified under the contract had not been built. In April 2021, WEDC and Foxconn approved a revised agreement under which Foxconn will be eligible to receive up to $80 million in performance-based tax credits if the company invests to $672 million and creates 1,454 jobs in Wisconsin by 2026. The new contract does not specify what Foxconn will build at the site.

Awards
WEDC has been nationally recognized for its transparency in reporting economic development awards. The organization provides a searchable online database and map of its awards.

See also
 Foxconn in Wisconsin
 Wisconsin Department of Commerce

External links
 Wisconsin Economic Development Corporation

References

Government of Wisconsin
State departments of economic development in the United States
2011 establishments in Wisconsin